Henry Thomas Marsh CBE FRCS (born 5 March 1950) is an English neurosurgeon, and a pioneer of neurosurgical advances in Ukraine. His widely acclaimed memoir Do No Harm: Stories of Life, Death and Brain Surgery was published in 2014. According to The Economist, this memoir is "so elegantly written it is little wonder some say that in Mr Marsh neurosurgery has found its Boswell." His second memoir Admissions: A life in brain surgery was published in 2017. And Finally, his most recent book, was published in 2022 to critical acclaim and explores his bewildering transition from doctor to patient.

Early life
Marsh is the youngest of his parents' four children. His parents, the law reformer Norman Stayner Marsh (1913–2008) and bookshop owner Christiane "Christel" Christinnecke, relocated from Halle in Germany to England in 1939 after his mother had been denounced to the Gestapo for "making anti-Nazi comments".   They married in London in the late summer of 1939.   

Marsh was born in 1950, in the countryside outside Oxford. His father was teaching at Oxford University. Marsh attended the Dragon School in Oxford. The family later moved to Clapham in London and he was sent to Westminster School, for a while as a boarder. Academically successful,  he studied Politics, Philosophy and Economics at University College, Oxford University, achieving First Class Honours, before graduating with Honours in Medicine from the Royal Free Medical School. His educational background and its social implications, however, left psychological issues and Marsh, contemplating suicide, was a voluntary patient for a while, taking a year off from studying to work as a porter in a northern hospital.

Career
Marsh was until 2015 the senior consultant neurosurgeon at the Atkinson Morley Wing at St George's Hospital, south London, one of the country's largest specialist brain surgery units.

He specialises in operating on the brain under local anaesthetic and was the subject of a major BBC documentary Your Life in Their Hands in 2004, which won the Royal Television Society Gold Medal.

He has been working with neurosurgeons in the former Soviet Union, mainly in Ukraine with protégé neurosurgeon Igor Kurilets, since 1992 and his work there was the subject of the BBC Storyville film The English Surgeon from 2007.

He has a particular interest in the influence of hospital buildings and design on patient outcomes and staff morale; he has broadcast and lectured widely on this subject.

In 2017 Marsh published Admissions: Life as a Brain Surgeon, a second memoir with Weidenfeld & Nicolson, an imprint of Orion.

Marsh was the castaway on BBC Radio 4's long-running Desert Island Discs in September 2018. His favourite selection was Better Not Look Down by B.B. King.

Awards and honours
Marsh was appointed Commander of the Order of the British Empire (CBE) in the 2010 Birthday Honours. Also in 2010 he presented the Leslie Oliver Oration at Queen's Hospital.

Personal life
Henry Marsh is married to the social anthropologist Kate Fox and spends his spare time making furniture and keeping bees. He is a younger brother of the architectural historian Bridget Cherry.

Marsh is a Patron of My Death My Decision, an organisation which seeks a more compassionate approach to dying in the UK, including the legal right to a medically-assisted death, if that is a person's persistent wish.

In April 2021 it was announced that Marsh had been diagnosed with advanced prostate cancer, which as of August 2022 is now in remission. He has, in the meantime, visited Ukraine to teach and advise local doctors.

Publications

References

Further reading

External links

 

1950 births
Living people
People educated at The Dragon School
People educated at Westminster School, London
Alumni of the UCL Medical School
Alumni of University College, Oxford
Alumni of the University of London
English neurosurgeons
Commanders of the Order of the British Empire
Fellows of the Royal College of Surgeons
21st-century English medical doctors